The Wind in the Willows is a British stop motion animated television series that was originally broadcast between 1984 and 1987, based on characters from Kenneth Grahame's 1908 novel The Wind in the Willows and following the 1983 feature-length pilot film.

The series continues from where the film left off, and original voice cast members David Jason, Richard Pearson and Michael Hordern return. However, Ian Carmichael, who had previously voiced Rat in the film, has now been cast as the narrator, and Rat is now played by Peter Sallis.

The series was made by Manchester-based animation company Cosgrove Hall for Thames Television and shown on the ITV network. An hour-long feature, A Tale of Two Toads, was broadcast in 1989. It ran for five seasons, with the final season airing in 1990 under the title Oh, Mr. Toad, with a different theme song. In some countries, the original title is retained in the fifth season, and all seasons were packaged together as The Wind in the Willows on DVD. In August 2022, the first three series, as well as the first TV film, were added to streaming service Britbox in the United Kingdom.

Cast
The series stars David Jason as Toad and the Chief Weasel, Michael Hordern as Badger, Peter Sallis as Rat (replacing Ian Carmichael who voiced Rat in the original 1983 film, though Carmichael remained in the series, having been re-cast as the narrator), and Richard Pearson as Mole. The Chief Weasel was almost always accompanied by his bumbling henchman, who was referred to in two separate episodes, "The Rescue" and "The Paperchase", as Bert.

Characters
 The Narrator (Ian Carmichael)

 Main characters 

 Mole (Richard Pearson) – Shy, gentle and honest, Mole lives in a modest home underground called Mole End. Although the book featured him as the key protagonist, he plays less of a role in the series in comparison with characters like Toad.
 Rat (Peter Sallis) – Best and platonic friend to Mole. A friendly and strait-laced everyman with a love of poetry and music, and a great passion for the river by which he lives.
 Toad (David Jason) – The wealthy owner of Toad Hall, the finest home in the county. Though arrogant, selfish, and ignorant, he is nonetheless charismatic, good-humoured, and cares for his friends dearly. He always throws himself into all kinds of new crazes, without much consideration. His main catchphrase is "It's the only thing!" He often gets himself in trouble, resulting in his friends saving him. Many episodes conclude with his friends chorusing "Oh, Toad!" in despair at his constant qualms and ineptitude. Toad is also accident-prone which is evident in certain episodes such as in "Mercury of the Motorbicycle", where he crashes his motor car at the start and his newly acquired motorbicycle at the end.
 Badger (Michael Hordern) – The father figure of the group. Respected by all for his intelligence and courage. He was a friend of Toad's late father and enjoys chess and canvas painting. Authoritarian and mature, but with a strong sense of justice, he always tries to keep Toad and the troublesome Weasels out of trouble. He is shown to play the violin in the episode "A Producer's Lot"
 Chief Weasel (David Jason) – The villainous leader of the Weasels, the bullies and thieves of the Wild Wood. He often tries to trick Toad out of his wealth. However, he is not all bad, and at times will selflessly come to the aid of other animals in need – examples including Mole in "Badger's Remedy"; Otter's son Portly in "The Piper At The Gates Of Dawn" and a lost shrew, Ernest, in "The Rescue". In two episodes, his name is revealed to be Bill.
 Henchman Weasel (Brian Trueman) – the Chief's somewhat dim-witted second-in-command; known for his catchphrase, "Very nice, very nice!". In "The Rescue", his name is revealed to be Bert.

 Recurring characters 

 Otter (Brian Southwood) – One of the inhabitants of the River Bank and an old friend of Rat.
 Portly (Brian Southwood) – Otter's son
 Billy Rabbit (David Jason) – "Billy" is present in all series. He first appears as an unnamed character the Series 1 episode "The Grand Annual Show", but becomes more of a recurring character from Series 3 onwards. He is not to be confused with Billy the Fieldmouse, who appears on and off in the series. Both appear together in a number of episodes.
 Alfred (Allan Bardsley) – Alfred is Toad's sarcastic and stubborn but well-meaning horse who always refuses to do what Toad wants to do. He briefly appeared in the film with a singing role and then made on and off appearances in the series. His catchphrases are "Nope" and "Ar".
 Auberon Mole (Howard Lloyd Lewis) – Mole's cousin; in the series, is a well-known playwright, and the focus of the episodes "Mole's Cousin", "Auberon's Return" and "Happy New Year".
 Mrs. Carrington-Moss (Beryl Reid) – The magistrate in the film; she appears in the episodes, "The Grand Annual Show", "Buried Treasure", and "Burglary at Toad Hall".
 Reggie and Rosemary – The owners of the stolen motor car in the film; they appear in the episodes, "The Grand Annual Show", and "Burglary at Toad Hall".
 Thomas (Jimmy Hibbert) – Auberon's chauffeur and personal assistant, who is also a toad. He appears in the episodes "Mole's Cousin" and "Happy New Year".

Background
The series is sometimes misidentified as being filmed in claymation. The method used by Cosgrove Hall is a stop-motion animation process using scale model sets and posable character figurines. The figurines are composed of an articulate metal skeleton (armature) covered in latex rubber, providing the flexibility and the detail which distinguishes the series.

The series is set at The Riverbank, a mythical location somewhere in Berkshire, south east England. The Riverbank is where Ratty, Mole and Toad live. Nearby is the Wild Wood, where Badger and the Weasels live. Each episode has a unique story line, although there are some common themes running throughout the series. In series 4, the humans start building a new railway that is planned to be built through the area where the animals live. The show teaches children about the destruction of forests and animals' natural habits. The railway gets closer and closer to the animals' homes, yet in the episode "Happy New Year" it turns out that the railway would be travelling over unsuitable land, and therefore the route is diverted from the Riverbank and Wild Wood areas.

Music
The popular theme song is based on the instrumental theme to the original film, which had been composed by Keith Hopwood and Malcolm Rowe and arranged by Brian Ibbetson. For the series, the song was adapted by the same composers and arranger and was sung by British singer-songwriter Ralph McTell. The Stone Roses guitarist John Squire also worked on this series, but as a prop maker, not a musician.

Episodes

Series 1 (1984)

Series 2 (1985–86)

Series 3 (1986–87)

Series 4 (1987–88)

Oh, Mr. Toad, Series 1 (1990)

Home releases

VHS/DVD (Region 2) 
 VHS – Video Collection International Ltd./DVD – PT Video Ltd.
 The film (1983) (VHS – 28 April 1986 and 11 October 1993 re-release and DVD 2000)
 Winter (DVD) / Winter Tales (VHS – 3 November 1986 & 17 October 1994) – The Yuletide Entertainment (Cut version on the DVD), Winter Sports, The Rescue (Cut version on the VHS).
 Summer (DVD) / Summer Escapades (VHS – 5 October 1987 & 1 September 1997) – Toad: Photographer, The Great Golfing Gamble, Grand Annual Show
 Spring (DVD) / Spring Follies (VHS – 4 April 1988 & 6 March 1995) – The Great Steamer, Paperchase (The Lost River in newer VHS 1995), May Day
 Autumn (DVD) / Autumn Antics (VHS – 7 November 1988 & 18 September 1995) – Harvest, Monster of the Wild Wood, Remember, Remember
 A Tale of Two Toads (1989) (VHS – 2 October 1989 & 7 March 1994 re-release and DVD 2008)
 The Four Seasons – A 2 VHS boxset (29 June 1998), containing one episode each from the original four season based Videos (see below) – May Day, Grand Annual Show, Harvest and Winter Sports.

VHS 
 All VHS titles released by Video Collection International Ltd.
 Masquerade (VHS – 1987) – A Producer's Lot, Winter Haunts, Fancy Dress.
 The Enthusiastic Mr Toad/Oh Toad! (Double Pack VHS – 5 October 1987)
 The Enthusiastic Mr Toad – Mercury of the Motorbicycle, Mr Toad's Telephone, Toad, Astronomer.
 Oh Toad! – Caught in a Maze, Masterchef, Champion of the Green Baize.
 Sample VHS tape (7 November 1988) that includes School Days and Hot Air
 The Further Adventures of Mr Toad (VHS – 24 April 1989) – The Further Adventures of Mr Toad, Patient Toad (The Storm in one with a different picture on its VHS cover), Fire at Toad Hall.
 Patient Toad and other stories (VHS – 1 May 1989) – Patient Toad, The Kidnapping of Toad, Badger's Remedy.
 Mole's Cousin and other stories (VHS – 1 May 1989 and 6 May 1991) – Mole's Cousin, Auberon Returns, Happy New Year.
 Oh! Mr Toad! (VHS – 5 February 1990) – Oarsman Toad, Midsummer Night's Disaster, The Complete Bungler.
 The Wind in the Willows Bumper Special (VHS – 10 September 1990) – Mr Toad of the Times,  Toad in Motion, Piano-Roll Toad, Gypsy Toad, Toad in Love.
 Happy Birthday and other stories (VHS – 7 October 1991) – Happy Birthday, A Toad in Time,  Film Maker.
 The Labyrinth and other stories (VHS – 6 April 1992) – The Labyrinth, Bankruptcy,  Unlikely Allies.
 Lord Toad and other stories (VHS – 6 April 1992) – Lord Toad, Hall for Sale, Toad's Harvest.
 My Bumper The Wind In The Willows: Fun & Games (VHS – 5 May 1997) – Mercury of the Motorbicycle, Champion of the Green Baize, The Tournament, Hot Air, Fighting Fit.

VHS Compilations
 Children's Favourites - Volume 1 (1 February 1988) - Wayfarers All. (Compilation VHS with Danger Mouse and Alias the Jester)
 Lollipop Children's Favourites Vol. 1 (1 May 1989) - Gadget Mad. (Compilation VHS with Count Duckula and Danger Mouse)
 Lollipop Children's Favourites Vol. 2 (1 May 1989) - The Ghost at Mole End. (Compilation VHS with Count Duckula and Danger Mouse)
 More Children's Summer Stories (5 June 1989) - The Tournament. (Compilation VHS with Count Duckula and Danger Mouse)
 More Children's Holiday Favourites (4 June 1990) - Fighting Fit. (Compilation VHS with Count Duckula and Danger Mouse)
 The Christmas Collection (5 October 1992) - Auld Lang Syne. (Compilation VHS with The Sooty Show and Rainbow)

DVD
 In 2003, Time Life DVD released a set of six DVDs with four digitally re-mastered episodes on each disc containing various episodes from Series 1 – 3; these were as follows:
1. Classic Willows Tales – 1. The Yuletide Entertainment (cut version), 2. Caught in a Maze, 3. Grand Annual Show, 4. Badger's Remedy.

2. Typical Toad – 1. Mercury of the Motor bicycle, 2. Burglary at Toad Hall, 3. Fire at Toad Hall, 4. Patient: Toad.

3. Ratty and Mole:Chums For Life – 1. The Ghost at Mole End, 2. The Great Steamer, 3. The Piper at the Gates of Dawn, 4. The Storm.

4. Champion of the Willows – 1. Paper Chase, 2. The Great Golfing Gamble, 3. Champion of the Green Baize, 4. Winter Sports.

5. Those Wily Weasels – 1. The Weasels' Trap, 2. The Rescue, 3. Unlikely Allies, 4. Fancy-Dress.

6. Wise Old Badger – 1. Buried Treasure, 2. Harvest, 3. School Days, 4. A Producer's Lot.

These DVDs are now out of print and are very hard to find, but can be found on eBay every so often.

 The Four Seasons – released in May 2006
 The Complete Series 1 – released on 26 March 2007
 The Complete Series 2 – released on 25 June 2007
 Wind In The Willows – The Complete Collection – released on 13 October 2008 (features all 65 episodes including those from Oh Mr. Toad! plus both films)
 3 DVDs were made as part of a one-off Daily Mail event around the end of 2008, each containing six episodes. Two of them are similar to The Four Seasons collection.
 Disc One: Six classic episodes from the 1st series – The Further Adventures of Toad, The Kidnapping of Toad, The Ghost at Mole End, Buried Treasure, Mole's Cousin, The Open Road Again.
 Disc Two: Spring and Summer – The Great Steamer, The Lost River, Paper Chase, May Day, Toad: Photographer, The Great Golfing Gamble, Grand Annual Show.
 Disc Three: Autumn and Winter – The Harvest, Monster of the Wild Wood, Remember, Remember, The Yuletide Entertainment, Winter Sports, The Rescue.

DVD (Region 1) 
In North America, home media distribution of both the show and the movie were handled by A&E Home Entertainment, under license from Thames, talkbackTHAMES, FremantleMedia International and FremantleMedia Kids & Family Entertainment. Previously the film had already been made available on VHS from HBO Video under license from Thames.

 The film (1983)
 A Tale of Two Toads (1989)
 The Feature Films Collection – a compendium of The Movie and A Tale of Two Toads.
 The Complete First Series
 The Complete Second Series
 The Wind in the Willows Four-Pack – includes both feature films, and the complete first and second series.

DVD (Region 4) 
 The film (1983) – There have been VHS releases of Summer, Autumn, Winter and Spring, among others. Fremantle Media also released the complete series in Australia and New Zealand.

References

External links 

1984 British television series debuts
1990 British television series endings
British children's animated adventure television series
ITV children's television shows
British stop-motion animated television series
British television shows based on children's books
Television shows based on The Wind in the Willows
1980s British children's television series
1990s British children's television series
Television shows produced by Thames Television
Television series by FremantleMedia Kids & Family
1980s British animated television series
1990s British animated television series
Television series by Cosgrove Hall Films
Animated television series about mice and rats
Animated television series about frogs